= Housecoat band =

Antiguan musical celebration

A housecoat band was a type of musical event in urban areas in 1940s Antigua and Barbuda. These formed when steel bands would perform in the streets early in the morning, luring residents to leave their homes and join the celebration. The name originates from the fact that due to timing of the events, participants would often be clothed in nightgowns, pajamas, or housecoats. These celebrations usually occurred in December in the lead up to Christmas. The most notable housecoat band is the Hell's Gate Steel Orchestra, the oldest continuously operating steel band still in existence.
